The Ravine du Sud (also known as La Ravine du Sud or the Ravine River) is a river of Haiti. The river flows through the Pic Macaya National Park.

See also
List of rivers of Haiti

References

Rivers of Haiti